Palo-sebo (from the Spanish stick/poase) is a traditional Filipino game. A local variant of the greasy pole, it is likely derived from the Spanish cucaña.

Description
This game is usually played by boys during a town fiesta or on special occasions in the various Provinces of the Philippines. Long and straight bamboo poles are polished and greased, after which a small bag containing the prize is tied to the top. The bag usually contains money, sweets, or toys. Sometimes a small flag is used instead of the actual prize, which is given to the winner afterwards.

Play
Contestants try to climb the pole in turns to secure the prize, and anyone who fails to reach the top is disqualified. The winner is the one who succeeds in reaching and untying the prize or retrieving the flag.

See also
Traditional Filipino games

References

Footnotes

Bibliography
Marsha's Encounter with the Little Prince - a children's story that defines the palosebo game, EduProjects.net
Barbosa, Artemio C. Palosebo,12 Philippine Games, Traditional Games in the Philippines, Infocus, About Culture an Arts, National Commission for Culture and the Arts, August 15, 2003, NCCA.gov.ph
Palosebo, Palaro (Game), Festival Components and Events, First National Komedya Festival, NCCA.gov.ph

External links

Images
Picture depicting the palosebo, Caminawit Photo Center at Bravenet.com
Picture depicting the palosebo at Flickr.com
Picture depicting the palosebo, Kids play the ‘palo sebo’, Pinoy Outlook/Sun+Stars e-magazine at Sunstar.com and Flickr.com

Short films
Playing the palosebo at YouTube.com
Playing the palosebo also at YouTube.com

Other related links
Filipino games and other links, from Pinoy Games, Pinas, DLSU-Manila (2002):
Philippine Games by Eric A. Gutierrez, from Geocities.com
Filipino Games, SeaSite.niu.edu 
100 Best Things of Being Pinoy, by Liborio G. Altarenos III (et al.), Sea Crest Trading Company (2000) and Philippine Daily Inquirer (June 14, 1998)

Games of physical skill
Philippine games